is a Japanese singer, actor and dancer formerly in the Japanese agency Johnny & Associates. He joined Johnny & Associates in 1995 and officially debuted in 2002 in the duo Tackey & Tsubasa with Hideaki Takizawa. They are signed to the record label Avex Trax. Imai released his first solo single, "Backborn", on February 24, 2010.

Profile 
Tsubasa Imai was born in Fujisawa, Japan, on October 17, 1981. Among his colleagues, he is known as a very talented dancer. His close friends among those in Johnny Entertainment agency are Hideaki Takizawa, Tsuyoshi Domoto, Toma Ikuta and Sho Sakurai. His nicknames are Tsuba and Imai-kun. He is an avid fan of the Japanese baseball team, the Yokohama BayStars, having supporting them since the time they were known as Taiyou Whales.

Tsubasa is known as one of the "Four Dancing Kings" in the Johnny & Associate agency along with Koichi Domoto of KinKi Kids. He has also appeared in many dramas and was the second lead in the annual musical production Shock. He returned to play the second lead role in the 2005 production of Endless Shock.

Career

Audition 
Tsubasa's older sister who was a fan of TOKIO sent in his application. During the audition, Johnny Kitagawa noticed his dancing and remarked, "YOU dance well." Tsubasa was originally supposed to debut solo, but decided along with Takizawa they would debut as a unit, Tackey & Tsubasa.

Flamenco 
In 2007 Tsubasa took a trip to Spain where he instantly fell in love with flamenco. He studied under the professional flamenco artist Hiroki Sato.

Ménière's Disease 
While rehearsing for Playzone in 2014, Tsubasa began to experience vertigo and found difficulty standing. He was admitted to the hospital where he was diagnosed with Ménière's Disease.

Filmography

Television
 Mokuyou no kaidan (1995)
 Brothers (ブラザーズ) (1998)
 Summer Snow (2000)
 Never Land (2001)
 Saigo no Bengonin (The Last Lawyer) (2003)
 Haru to Natsu (2005)
 Yoshitsune (2005), Nasu no Yoichi
 Kirin ga Kuru (2020), Mōri Shinsuke
 Ojisan wa Kawaii Mono ga Osuki (2020)

Film 
 Life in Overtime (2018)
 What She Likes... (2021)
 Tell Me (2022), Hiroshi

Anime 
 Layton Detective Agency ~Katrielle's Mystery Solving Files~ as Simon Wright (2018)

Discography 
See: Tackey & Tsubasa Discography

Singles

Radio 
 To base (翼のto base) is Tsubasa's weekly radio show which is broadcast on the Japanese radio station JORQ AM 1134 kHz.

TV 
 TV de Spain-Go

Commercials 
 Tongari Corn Commercial spokesperson ( 2001–2006 )
 Nissin (2011)

Concerts 
 "TSUBACON" 2004 (August 6–18, 2004)
 "23 to 24" First Solo Tour 2005 (September 17 - November 6; December 28–29, 2005)
 "STYLE" 2006 Tour (August 12 - October 1, 2006)
 "Dance and Rock Tour '09 (2009)
 LHTOUR 2011 Dance & Rock Third Floor ~DiVelN to SExaLiVe (2011)

Stage 
An annual musical production, Shock is performed in the Imperial Garden Theater in Tokyo. The lead role is played by Koichi Domoto of KinKi Kids and Tsubasa acts in the second leading role.
 Shock 2000 - Millenium Shock (November 2–26)
 Shock 2001-2002 - Shock (December 1–25; January 3–27)
 Shock 2002 - Shock (June 4–28)
 Shock 2004 - Shocking Shock (February 6–29）
 Shock 2005 - Endless Shock (January 8 - February 28）
 Shock 2006 - Endless Shock (February 6 - March 29）
 "World Wing 翼 Premium (2007)
 "World Wing 翼 Premium (2008)
 PLAYZONE 2010 - ROAD TO PLAYZONE
 PLAYZONE 2011 - SONG & DANC'N
 PLAYZONE 2012 - SONG & DANC'N PART II
 PLAYZONE 2013 - SONG & DANC'N PART III
 PLAYZONE 1986….2014 ★Arigatou! ~AOYAMA THEATRE★ (July 6 - September)
 PLAYZONE 2015 - ★Sayonara! ~AOYAMA THEATRE★ PLAYZONE 30YEARS
 Burn the Floor 2012 - Around the World Tour (December 5–9 TOKYU Theatre Orb; December 12–16 Orix Theatre Osaka) 
 Burn the Floor 2014 - Dance with You (May 2–7 TOKYU Theatre Orb; May 9–13 Festival Hall; May 16–18 Nagoya Congress Center)
 GOEMON (2014)
 GOEMON (2016)
 Marius (2017)
 Musical GOYA (2021) title role

Videos/DVDs 
 "TSUBACON" 2004
 "23 to 24" First Solo Tour 2005
 Dance and Rock Tour '09
 LHTOUR 2011 Dance & Rock Third Floor ~DiVelN to SExaLiVe

References

External links 
 Tackey & Tsubasa official website

1981 births
21st-century Japanese male singers
21st-century Japanese singers
Avex Group artists
Japanese film actors
Japanese male actors
Japanese male dancers
Japanese male pop singers
Japanese television actors
Johnny & Associates
Living people
Musicians from Kanagawa Prefecture
People from Fujisawa, Kanagawa
People with Ménière's Disease